Caritas Institute of Higher Education (formerly known as Caritas Francis Hsu College) is a post-secondary college in Hong Kong established by Caritas Hong Kong, with campuses located at Tseung Kwan O, New Territories. The institute is able to award bachelor's degree or below.

It was initially named after Francis Hsu, the Bishop of Hong Kong between 1969 and 1973. Until May 2011, the college was granted the degree-conferring status and it was renamed as Caritas Institute of Higher Education as an institution for its academic awards up to bachelor's degree level.

The institute is currently offering bachelor's degree (honours) in business administration, social science, language and liberal studies, translation technology, education, entrepreneurial management, health sciences, nursing, science and social work; higher diploma programmes in business, computing, social sciences, language, design, health sciences, education and music disciplines and diploma in general studies. In the future, the institute would offer more bachelor's degree programmes in various disciplines. "Towards a Catholic University" is the recent motto of the institute.

See also
List of universities in Hong Kong
Caritas Hong Kong

External links
Official website

Catholic universities and colleges in Hong Kong
Mid-Levels
Tiu Keng Leng
Educational institutions established in 1985
Universities in Hong Kong
Catholic Church in Hong Kong
Caritas Hong Kong
1985 establishments in Hong Kong